Major-General Leslie Keith Lockhart  (5 June 1897 – 27 March 1966) was a British Army officer.

Military career
After attending and later graduating from the Royal Military Academy, Woolwich, Lockhart was commissioned into the Royal Field Artillery on 28 July 1915. He was awarded the Military Cross for services in the First World War.

Remaining in the army during the interwar period, he attended the Staff College, Camberley, alongside future general officers such as William Dimoline, John Eldridge and Ashton Wade, from 1933 to 1934.

He served in the Second World War as a colonel on the British Army Staff at Washington, D.C. from 1940, as Deputy Director of Royal Artillery at the War Office from October 1942 and as commander of an Anti-Aircraft Brigade in North-West Europe from 1944. He then served as Deputy General Officer Commanding the Anti-Aircraft Units of 21st Army Group in North-West Europe from early 1945 and as commander of 307th Infantry Brigade from May 1945.

After the war he became commander of 5th Anti-Aircraft Group on the East Coast in 1947 and General Officer Commanding East Anglian District in May 1951 before retiring in December 1952.

References

External links
Generals of World War II

1897 births
1966 deaths
Graduates of the Royal Military Academy, Woolwich
Companions of the Order of the Bath
Commanders of the Order of the British Empire
Recipients of the Military Cross
Royal Field Artillery officers
British Army major generals
Graduates of the Staff College, Camberley
British Army personnel of World War I
British Army brigadiers of World War II
Royal Artillery officers